Yelling is an English surname. Notable people with the surname include:

 Hayley Yelling (born 1974), British runner
 Liz Yelling (born 1974), British runner, sister-in-law of Hayley

See also
 Yellin

English-language surnames